The Moriarty Rocks, part of the Passage Group within the Furneaux Group, are a group of two major unpopulated granite rocks, and several smaller ones, with a combined area of , located in Bass Strait, south of Cape Barren Island, west of the Low Islets, and west of the Spike and Clarke islands, in Tasmania, in south-eastern Australia. The rocks are contained within a nature reserve.

History
Sealing is reported to have taken on the rocks in December 1830.

Flora and fauna
There is little vegetation on the rocks, due to them being frequently wave-washed.  black-faced cormorants breed there, and they hold an important breeding colony of Australian fur seals, with up to about 1000 pups being born there annually.

See also

 List of islands of Tasmania

References

Furneaux Group
Protected areas of Tasmania
Islands of North East Tasmania
Islands of Bass Strait
Seal hunting